Blair Suffredine is a Canadian politician. He served as a BC Liberal Member of the Legislative Assembly of British Columbia, representing the riding of Nelson-Creston from 2001 to 2005.

On May 24, 2010, Suffredine was a passenger in a small plane that crashed in Kootenay Lake.  He was unharmed.

Suffredine was counsel for the defence in the 2017 trial of fundamentalist Mormon leader Winston Blackmore for polygamy.

References

External links
 Blair Suffredine at the Legislative Assembly of British Columbia

British Columbia Liberal Party MLAs
1951 births
People from Nelson, British Columbia
Politicians from Saskatoon
Living people
21st-century Canadian politicians